Top of the World is an album by Jimmy Sturr, released through Rounder Records in 2002. In 2003, the album won Sturr the Grammy Award for Best Polka Album.

Track listing
 "Top of the World" [Polka] (Bettis, Carpenter) – 3:27
 "City of New Orleans" [Polka] (Goodman) – 3:24
 "Streamline" [Polka] (Mayall, Mocarski) – 3:53
 "The Little Shoemaker" [Polka] – 2:11
 "Guacamole" [Polka] (Fender, Levy, Meyers) – 2:55
 "Rocking Alone in an Old Rocking Chair" [Waltz] (Carvell) – 3:26
 "This Land Is Your Land" [Polka] (Guthrie) – 2:35
 "Metropole" [Polka] – 2:11
 "No Fun Being Old" [Polka] (Karnish) – 3:37
 "Patriotic Polka" [Polka] – 3:12
 "The Devil Went Down to Georgia" [Polka] (Crain, Daniels, DeGregorio, Edwards) – 3:36
 "Polka Paradise" [Polka] (Forsythe, Pick) – 1:48
 "God Bless America Again" [Ballad] (Bare, Hawkins) – 2:49

Personnel

 Mark Bernstein – Bass
 Mark Capps – Engineer
 Dennis Coyman – Drums
 Tom Crain – Composer
 Wally Czerniawski – Accordion
 Charlie Daniels – Composer
 Ray DeBrown – Arranger
 Taz DeGregorio – Composer
 Nick Devito – Clarinet, Sax (Alto)
 Joe Donofrio – Mixing
 Fred Edwards – Composer
 Nancy Given – Design
 Ken Harbus – Arranger, Trumpet
 Charlie Hayward – Composer
 Ken Irwin – Mixing, Producer
 Johnny Karas – Sax (Tenor), Vocals
 James Marshall – Composer

 John Mayall – Composer
 Dr. Toby Mountain – Mastering
 Al Noble – Trumpet
 Louis Dean Nunley – Vocals (Background)
 Eric Parks – Trumpet
 Al Piatkowski – Accordion
 Tom Pick – Engineer, Mixing, Producer
 David Royko – Liner Notes
 Keith Slattery – Arranger, Piano
 Gerry Stavisky – Clarinet
 Gordon Stoker – Vocals (Background)
 Jimmy Sturr – Mixing, Narrator, Photography, Producer
 Frank Urbanovitch – Arranger, Fiddle, Vocals
 Jeremy Welch – Engineer
 Henry Will – Arranger
 Curtis Young – Vocals (Background)
 Arlo Guthrie
 Rhonda Vincent

See also
 Polka in the United States

References

2003 albums
Grammy Award for Best Polka Album
Jimmy Sturr albums
Rounder Records albums